The Monty Hall problem is a brain teaser, in the form of a probability puzzle, loosely based on the American television game show Let's Make a Deal and named after its original host, Monty Hall. The problem was originally posed (and solved) in a letter by Steve Selvin to the American Statistician in 1975. It became famous as a question from reader Craig F. Whitaker's letter quoted in Marilyn vos Savant's "Ask Marilyn" column in Parade magazine in 1990:

Vos Savant's response was that the contestant should switch to the other door. Under the standard assumptions, the switching strategy has a  probability of winning the car, while the strategy that remains with the initial choice has only a  probability.

When the player first makes their choice, there is a  chance that the car is behind one of the doors not chosen. This probability does not change after the host reveals a goat behind one of the unchosen doors. When the host provides information about the 2 unchosen doors (revealing that one of them does not have the car behind it), the  chance of the car being behind one of the unchosen doors rests on the unchosen and unrevealed door, as opposed to the  chance of the car being behind the door the contestant chose initially.

The given probabilities depend on specific assumptions about how the host and contestant choose their doors. A key insight is that, under these standard conditions, there is more information about doors 2 and 3 than was available at the beginning of the game when door 1 was chosen by the player: the host's deliberate action adds value to the door he did not choose to eliminate, but not to the one chosen by the contestant originally. Another insight is that switching doors is a different action from choosing between the two remaining doors at random, as the first action uses the previous information and the latter does not. Other possible behaviors of the host than the one described can reveal different additional information, or none at all, and yield different probabilities.

Many readers of vos Savant's column refused to believe switching is beneficial and rejected her explanation. After the problem appeared in Parade, approximately 10,000 readers, including nearly 1,000 with PhDs, wrote to the magazine, most of them calling vos Savant wrong. Even when given explanations, simulations, and formal mathematical proofs, many people still did not accept that switching is the best strategy. Paul Erdős, one of the most prolific mathematicians in history, remained unconvinced until he was shown a computer simulation demonstrating vos Savant's predicted result.

The problem is a paradox of the veridical type, because the solution is so counterintuitive it can seem absurd but is nevertheless demonstrably true. The Monty Hall problem is mathematically closely related to the earlier Three Prisoners problem and to the much older Bertrand's box paradox.

Paradox
Steve Selvin wrote a letter to the American Statistician in 1975, describing a problem based on the game show Let's Make a Deal, dubbing it the "Monty Hall problem" in a subsequent letter. The problem is mathematically equivalent to the Three Prisoners problem described in Martin Gardner's "Mathematical Games" column in Scientific American in 1959 and the Three Shells Problem described in Gardner's book Aha Gotcha.

Standard assumptions
The key to this solution is the behavior of the host. Ambiguities in the Parade version do not explicitly define the protocol of the host. However, Marilyn vos Savant's solution printed alongside Whitaker's question implies, and both Selven and vos Savant explicitly define, the role of the host as follows:
 The host must always open a door that was not picked by the contestant.
 The host must always open a door to reveal a goat and never the car.
 The host must always offer the chance to switch between the originally chosen door and the remaining closed door.

When any of these assumptions is varied, it can change the probability of winning by switching doors as detailed in the section below. It is also typically presumed that the car is initially hidden randomly behind the doors and that, if the player initially picks the car, then the host's choice of which goat-hiding door to open is random. Some authors, independently or inclusively, assume that the player's initial choice is random as well.

Simple solutions

The solution presented by vos Savant in Parade shows the three possible arrangements of one car and two goats behind three doors and the result of staying or switching after initially picking door 1 in each case:

{| class="wikitable" style="margin:left; text-align: center;"
|-
! Behind door 1 || Behind door 2 || Behind door 3 || Result if staying at door #1 || Result if switching to the door offered
|-
| Goat || Goat || Car || Wins goat || Wins car
|-
| Goat || Car || Goat || Wins goat || Wins car
|-
| Car || Goat || Goat || Wins car || Wins goat
|}

A player who stays with the initial choice wins in only one out of three of these equally likely possibilities, while a player who switches wins in two out of three.

An intuitive explanation is that, if the contestant initially picks a goat (2 of 3 doors), the contestant will win the car by switching because the other goat can no longer be picked – the host had to reveal its location –, whereas if the contestant initially picks the car (1 of 3 doors), the contestant will not win the car by switching. Using the switching strategy, winning or losing thus only depends on whether the contestant has initially chosen a goat ( probability) or the car ( probability). The fact that the host subsequently reveals a goat in one of the unchosen doors changes nothing about the initial probability.

Most people come to the conclusion that switching does not matter because there are two unopened doors and one car and that it is a 50/50 choice. This would be true if the host opens a door randomly, but that is not the case; the door opened depends on the player's initial choice, so the assumption of independence does not hold. Before the host opens a door there is a  probability that the car is behind each door. If the car is behind door 1 the host can open either door 2 or door 3, so the probability that the car is behind door 1 and the host opens door 3 is  ×  = . If the car is behind door 2 (and the player has picked door 1) the host must open door 3, so the probability that the car is behind door 2 and the host opens door 3 is  × 1 = . These are the only cases where the host opens door 3, so if the player has picked door 1 and the host opens door 3, the car is twice as likely to be behind door 2 as door 1. The key is that if the car is behind door 2 the host must open door 3, but if the car is behind door 1 the host can open either door.

Another way to understand the solution is to consider the two original unchosen doors together. As Cecil Adams puts it, "Monty is saying in effect: you can keep your one door or you can have the other two doors." The  chance of finding the car has not been changed by the opening of one of these doors because Monty, knowing the location of the car, is certain to reveal a goat. So the player's choice after the host opens a door is no different than if the host offered the player the option to switch from the original chosen door to the set of both remaining doors. The switch in this case clearly gives the player a  probability of choosing the car.

I'll help you by using my knowledge of where the prize is to open one of those two doors to show you that it does not hide the prize. You can now take advantage of this additional information. Your choice of door A has a chance of 1 in 3 of being the winner. I have not changed that. But by eliminating door C, I have shown you that the probability that door B hides the prize is 2 in 3.

Vos Savant suggests that the solution will be more intuitive with 1,000,000 doors rather than 3. In this case, there are 999,999 doors with goats behind them and one door with a prize. After the player picks a door, the host opens 999,998 of the remaining doors. On average, in 999,999 times out of 1,000,000, the remaining door will contain the prize. Intuitively, the player should ask how likely it is that, given a million doors, they managed to pick the right one initially. Stibel et al proposed that working memory demand is taxed during the Monty Hall problem and that this forces people to "collapse" their choices into two equally probable options. They report that when the number of options is increased to more than 7 choices (7 doors), people tend to switch more often; however, most contestants still incorrectly judge the probability of success at 50:50.

Vos Savant and the media furor

Vos Savant wrote in her first column on the Monty Hall problem that the player should switch. She received thousands of letters from her readers – the vast majority of which, including many from readers with PhDs, disagreed with her answer. During 1990–1991, three more of her columns in Parade were devoted to the paradox. Numerous examples of letters from readers of vos Savant's columns are presented and discussed in The Monty Hall Dilemma: A Cognitive Illusion Par Excellence.

The discussion was replayed in other venues (e.g., in Cecil Adams' "The Straight Dope" newspaper column) and reported in major newspapers such as The New York Times.

In an attempt to clarify her answer, she proposed a shell game to illustrate: "You look away, and I put a pea under one of three shells. Then I ask you to put your finger on a shell. Then I simply lift up an empty shell from the remaining other two. As I can (and will) do this regardless of what you've chosen, we've learned nothing to allow us to revise the odds on the shell under your finger." She also proposed a similar simulation with three playing cards.

Vos Savant commented that, though some confusion was caused by some readers' not realizing they were supposed to assume that the host must always reveal a goat, almost all her numerous correspondents had correctly understood the problem assumptions, and were still initially convinced that vos Savant's answer ("switch") was wrong.

Confusion and criticism

Sources of confusion
When first presented with the Monty Hall problem, an overwhelming majority of people assume that each door has an equal probability and conclude that switching does not matter. Out of 228 subjects in one study, only 13% chose to switch. In his book The Power of Logical Thinking, cognitive psychologist  writes: "No other statistical puzzle comes so close to fooling all the people all the time [and] even Nobel physicists systematically give the wrong answer, and that they insist on it, and they are ready to berate in print those who propose the right answer." Pigeons repeatedly exposed to the problem show that they rapidly learn to always switch, unlike humans.

Most statements of the problem, notably the one in Parade, do not match the rules of the actual game show  and do not fully specify the host's behavior or that the car's location is randomly selected. However, Krauss and Wang argue that people make the standard assumptions even if they are not explicitly stated.

Although these issues are mathematically significant, even when controlling for these factors, nearly all people still think each of the two unopened doors has an equal probability and conclude that switching does not matter. This "equal probability" assumption is a deeply rooted intuition. People strongly tend to think probability is evenly distributed across as many unknowns as are present, whether it is or not.

The problem continues to attract the attention of cognitive psychologists. The typical behavior of the majority, i.e., not switching, may be explained by phenomena known in the psychological literature as:

 The endowment effect, in which people tend to overvalue the winning probability of the already chosen – already "owned" – door.
 The status quo bias, in which people prefer to stick with the choice of door they have already made.
 The errors of omission vs. errors of commission effect, in which, all other things being equal, people prefer to make errors through inaction (Stay) as opposed to action (Switch).

Experimental evidence confirms that these are plausible explanations that do not depend on probability intuition. Another possibility is that people's intuition simply does not deal with the textbook version of the problem, but with a real game show setting. There, the possibility exists that the show master plays deceitfully by opening other doors only if a door with the car was initially chosen. A show master playing deceitfully half of the times modifies the winning chances in case one is offered to switch to "equal probability".

Criticism of the simple solutions

Among these sources are several that explicitly criticize the popularly presented "simple" solutions, saying these solutions are "correct but ... shaky", or do not "address the problem posed", or are "incomplete", or are "unconvincing and misleading", or are (most bluntly) "false".

Some say that these solutions answer a slightly different question – one phrasing is "you have to announce before a door has been opened whether you plan to switch".

The simple solutions show in various ways that a contestant who is determined to switch will win the car with probability , and hence that switching is the winning strategy, if the player has to choose in advance between "always switching", and "always staying". However, the probability of winning by always switching is a logically distinct concept from the probability of winning by switching given that the player has picked door 1 and the host has opened door 3. As one source says, "the distinction between [these questions] seems to confound many". The fact that these are different can be shown by varying the problem so that these two probabilities have different numeric values. For example, assume the contestant knows that Monty does not pick the second door randomly among all legal alternatives but instead, when given an opportunity to pick between two losing doors, Monty will open the one on the right. In this situation, the following two questions have different answers:
 What is the probability of winning the car by always switching?
 What is the probability of winning the car by switching given the player has picked door 1 and the host has opened door 3?
This is because Monty's preference for rightmost doors means that he opens door 3 if the car is behind door 1 (which it is originally with probability ) or if the car is behind door 2 (also originally with probability ). For this variation, the two questions yield different answers. This is partially because the assumed condition of the second question (that the host opens door 3) would only occur in this variant with probability .

In Morgan et al., four university professors published an article in The American Statistician claiming that vos Savant gave the correct advice but the wrong argument. Only when the decision is completely randomized is the chance .

In an invited comment and in subsequent letters to the editor, Morgan et al were supported by some writers, criticized by others; in each case a response by Morgan et al is published alongside the letter or comment in The American Statistician. In particular, vos Savant defended herself vigorously. Morgan et al complained in their response to vos Savant that vos Savant still had not actually responded to their own main point. Later in their response to Hogbin and Nijdam, they did agree that it was natural to suppose that the host chooses a door to open completely at random, when he does have a choice, and hence that the conditional probability of winning by switching (i.e., conditional given the situation the player is in when he has to make his choice) has the same value, as the unconditional probability of winning by switching (i.e., averaged over all possible situations). This equality was already emphasized by Bell (1992), who suggested that Morgan et al'''s mathematically involved solution would appeal only to statisticians, whereas the equivalence of the conditional and unconditional solutions in the case of symmetry was intuitively obvious.

There is disagreement in the literature regarding whether vos Savant's formulation of the problem, as presented in Parade, is asking the first or second question, and whether this difference is significant. Behrends concludes that "One must consider the matter with care to see that both analyses are correct"; which is not to say that they are the same. Several critics of the paper by Morgan et al., whose contributions were published alongside the original paper, criticized the authors for altering vos Savant's wording and misinterpreting her intention. One discussant (William Bell) considered it a matter of taste whether one explicitly mentions that (under the standard conditions), which door is opened by the host is independent of whether one should want to switch.

Among the simple solutions, the "combined doors solution" comes closest to a conditional solution, as we saw in the discussion of approaches using the concept of odds and Bayes' theorem. It is based on the deeply rooted intuition that revealing information that is already known does not affect probabilities. But, knowing that the host can open one of the two unchosen doors to show a goat does not mean that opening a specific door would not affect the probability that the car is behind the initially chosen door. The point is, though we know in advance that the host will open a door and reveal a goat, we do not know which door he will open. If the host chooses uniformly at random between doors hiding a goat (as is the case in the standard interpretation), this probability indeed remains unchanged, but if the host can choose non-randomly between such doors, then the specific door that the host opens reveals additional information. The host can always open a door revealing a goat and (in the standard interpretation of the problem) the probability that the car is behind the initially chosen door does not change, but it is not because of the former that the latter is true. Solutions based on the assertion that the host's actions cannot affect the probability that the car is behind the initially chosen appear persuasive, but the assertion is simply untrue unless each of the host's two choices are equally likely, if he has a choice. The assertion therefore needs to be justified; without justification being given, the solution is at best incomplete. The answer can be correct but the reasoning used to justify it is defective.

Solutions using conditional probability and other solutions
The simple solutions above show that a player with a strategy of switching wins the car with overall probability , i.e., without taking account of which door was opened by the host. In accordance with this, most sources in the field of probability calculate the conditional probabilities that the car is behind door 1 and door 2 to be  and  respectively given the contestant initially picks door 1 and the host opens door 3. The solutions in this section consider just those cases in which the player picked door 1 and the host opened door 3.

Refining the simple solution
If we assume that the host opens a door at random, when given a choice, then which door the host opens gives us no information at all as to whether or not the car is behind door 1. In the simple solutions, we have already observed that the probability that the car is behind door 1, the door initially chosen by the player, is initially . Moreover, the host is certainly going to open a (different) door, so opening a door (which door unspecified) does not change this.  must be the average probability that the car is behind door 1 given the host picked door 2 and given the host picked door 3 because these are the only two possibilities. But, these two probabilities are the same.

Conditional probability by direct calculation

By definition, the conditional probability of winning by switching given the contestant initially picks door 1 and the host opens door 3 is the probability for the event "car is behind door 2 and host opens door 3" divided by the probability for "host opens door 3". These probabilities can be determined referring to the conditional probability table below, or to an equivalent decision tree.

The conditional probability table below shows how 300 cases, in all of which the player initially chooses door 1, would be split up, on average, according to the location of the car and the choice of door to open by the host.

Bayes' theorem

Many probability text books and articles in the field of probability theory derive the conditional probability solution through a formal application of Bayes' theorem; among them books by Gill and Henze. Use of the odds form of Bayes' theorem, often called Bayes' rule, makes such a derivation more transparent.

This remains the case after the player has chosen door 1, by independence. According to Bayes' rule, the posterior odds on the location of the car, given that the host opens door 3, are equal to the prior odds multiplied by the Bayes factor or likelihood, which is, by definition, the probability of the new piece of information (host opens door 3) under each of the hypotheses considered (location of the car). Now, since the player initially chose door 1, the chance that the host opens door 3 is 50% if the car is behind door 1, 100% if the car is behind door 2, 0% if the car is behind door 3. Thus, the posterior odds become equal to the Bayes factor . Given that the host opened door 3, the probability that the car is behind door 3 is zero, and it is twice as likely to be behind door 2 than door 1.

Richard Gill analyzes the likelihood for the host to open door 3 as follows. Given that the car is not behind door 1, it is equally likely that it is behind door 2 or 3. Therefore, the chance that the host opens door 3 is 50%. Given that the car is behind door 1, the chance that the host opens door 3 is also 50%, because, when the host has a choice, either choice is equally likely. Therefore, whether or not the car is behind door 1, the chance that the host opens door 3 is 50%. Therefore, the posterior odds against door 1 hiding the car remain the same as the prior odds, .

In words, the information which door is opened by the host (door 2 or door 3?) reveals no information at all about whether or not the car is behind door 1, and this is precisely what is alleged to be intuitively obvious by supporters of simple solutions, or using the idioms of mathematical proofs, "obviously true, by symmetry".

Strategic dominance solution
Going back to Nalebuff, the Monty Hall problem is also much studied in the literature on game theory and decision theory, and also some popular solutions correspond to this point of view. Vos Savant asks for a decision, not a chance. And the chance aspects of how the car is hidden and how an unchosen door is opened are unknown. From this point of view, one has to remember that the player has two opportunities to make choices: first of all, which door to choose initially; and secondly, whether or not to switch. Since he does not know how the car is hidden nor how the host makes choices, he may be able to make use of his first choice opportunity, as it were to neutralize the actions of the team running the quiz show, including the host.

Following Gill, a strategy of contestant involves two actions: the initial choice of a door and the decision to switch (or to stick) which may depend on both the door initially chosen and the door to which the host offers switching. For instance, one contestant's strategy is "choose door 1, then switch to door 2 when offered, and do not switch to door 3 when offered". Twelve such deterministic strategies of the contestant exist.

Elementary comparison of contestant's strategies shows that, for every strategy A, there is another strategy B "pick a door then switch no matter what happens" that dominates it. No matter how the car is hidden and no matter which rule the host uses when he has a choice between two goats, if A wins the car then B also does. For example, strategy A "pick door 1 then always stick with it" is dominated by the strategy B "pick door 2 then always switch after the host reveals a door": A wins when door 1 conceals the car, while B wins when either of the doors 1 or 3 conceals the car.
Similarly, strategy A "pick door 1 then switch to door 2 (if offered), but do not switch to door 3 (if offered)" is dominated by strategy B "pick door 2 then always switch". A wins when door 1 conceals the car and Monty chooses to open door 2 or if  door 3 conceals the car.  Strategy B wins when either door 1 or door 3 conceals the car, that is, whenever A wins or if door 1 conceals the car and Monty chooses to open door 3.

Dominance is a strong reason to seek for a solution among always-switching strategies, under fairly general assumptions on the environment in which the contestant is making decisions. In particular, if the car is hidden by means of some randomization device – like tossing symmetric or asymmetric three-sided die – the dominance implies that a strategy maximizing the probability of winning the car will be among three always-switching strategies, namely it will be the strategy that initially picks the least likely door then switches no matter which door to switch is offered by the host.

Strategic dominance links the Monty Hall problem to game theory. In the zero-sum game setting of Gill, discarding the non-switching strategies reduces the game to the following simple variant: the host (or the TV-team) decides on the door to hide the car, and the contestant chooses two doors (i.e., the two doors remaining after the player's first, nominal, choice). The contestant wins (and her opponent loses) if the car is behind one of the two doors she chose.

Solutions by simulation

A simple way to demonstrate that a switching strategy really does win two out of three times with the standard assumptions is to simulate the game with playing cards. Three cards from an ordinary deck are used to represent the three doors; one 'special' card represents the door with the car and two other cards represent the goat doors.

The simulation can be repeated several times to simulate multiple rounds of the game. The player picks one of the three cards, then, looking at the remaining two cards the 'host' discards a goat card. If the card remaining in the host's hand is the car card, this is recorded as a switching win; if the host is holding a goat card, the round is recorded as a staying win. As this experiment is repeated over several rounds, the observed win rate for each strategy is likely to approximate its theoretical win probability, in line with the law of large numbers.

Repeated plays also make it clearer why switching is the better strategy. After the player picks his card, it is already determined whether switching will win the round for the player. If this is not convincing, the simulation can be done with the entire deck. In this variant, the car card goes to the host 51 times out of 52, and stays with the host no matter how many non-car cards are discarded.

Variants
A common variant of the problem, assumed by several academic authors as the canonical problem, does not make the simplifying assumption that the host must uniformly choose the door to open, but instead that he uses some other strategy. The confusion as to which formalization is authoritative has led to considerable acrimony, particularly because this variant makes proofs more involved without altering the optimality of the always-switch strategy for the player. In this variant, the player can have different probabilities of winning depending on the observed choice of the host, but in any case the probability of winning by switching is at least  (and can be as high as 1), while the overall probability of winning by switching is still exactly . The variants are sometimes presented in succession in textbooks and articles intended to teach the basics of probability theory and game theory. A considerable number of other generalizations have also been studied.

Other host behaviors
The version of the Monty Hall problem published in Parade in 1990 did not specifically state that the host would always open another door, or always offer a choice to switch, or even never open the door revealing the car. However, vos Savant made it clear in her second follow-up column that the intended host's behavior could only be what led to the  probability she gave as her original answer. "Anything else is a different question." "Virtually all of my critics understood the intended scenario. I personally read nearly three thousand letters (out of the many additional thousands that arrived) and found nearly every one insisting simply that because two options remained (or an equivalent error), the chances were even. Very few raised questions about ambiguity, and the letters actually published in the column were not among those few." The answer follows if the car is placed randomly behind any door, the host must open a door revealing a goat regardless of the player's initial choice and, if two doors are available, chooses which one to open randomly. The table below shows a variety of other possible host behaviors and the impact on the success of switching.

Determining the player's best strategy within a given set of other rules the host must follow is the type of problem studied in game theory. For example, if the host is not required to make the offer to switch the player may suspect the host is malicious and makes the offers more often if the player has initially selected the car. In general, the answer to this sort of question depends on the specific assumptions made about the host's behavior, and might range from "ignore the host completely" to "toss a coin and switch if it comes up heads"; see the last row of the table below.

Morgan et al and Gillman both show a more general solution where the car is (uniformly) randomly placed but the host is not constrained to pick uniformly randomly if the player has initially selected the car, which is how they both interpret the statement of the problem in Parade despite the author's disclaimers. Both changed the wording of the Parade version to emphasize that point when they restated the problem. They consider a scenario where the host chooses between revealing two goats with a preference expressed as a probability q, having a value between 0 and 1. If the host picks randomly q would be  and switching wins with probability  regardless of which door the host opens. This means even without constraining the host to pick randomly if the player initially selects the car, the player is never worse off switching. However neither source suggests the player knows what the value of q is so the player cannot attribute a probability other than the  that vos Savant assumed was implicit.

N doors
D. L. Ferguson (1975 in a letter to Selvin) suggests an N-door generalization of the original problem in which the host opens p losing doors and then offers the player the opportunity to switch; in this variant switching wins with probability .

Even if the host opens only a single door, the player is better off switching in every case. As N grows larger, the advantage decreases and approaches zero.

Quantum version
A quantum version of the paradox illustrates some points about the relation between classical or non-quantum information and quantum information, as encoded in the states of quantum mechanical systems. The formulation is loosely based on quantum game theory. The three doors are replaced by a quantum system allowing three alternatives; opening a door and looking behind it is translated as making a particular measurement. The rules can be stated in this language, and once again the choice for the player is to stick with the initial choice, or change to another "orthogonal" option. The latter strategy turns out to double the chances, just as in the classical case. However, if the show host has not randomized the position of the prize in a fully quantum mechanical way, the player can do even better, and can sometimes even win the prize with certainty.

History
The earliest of several probability puzzles related to the Monty Hall problem is Bertrand's box paradox, posed by Joseph Bertrand in 1889 in his Calcul des probabilités. In this puzzle, there are three boxes: a box containing two gold coins, a box with two silver coins, and a box with one of each. After choosing a box at random and withdrawing one coin at random that happens to be a gold coin, the question is what is the probability that the other coin is gold.

The Three Prisoners problem, published in Martin Gardner's Mathematical Games column in Scientific American in 1959  is equivalent to the Monty Hall problem. This problem involves three condemned prisoners, a random one of whom has been secretly chosen to be pardoned. The warden obliges, (secretly) flipping a coin to decide which name to provide if the prisoner who is asking is the one being pardoned. The question is whether knowing the warden's answer changes the prisoner's chances of being pardoned. This problem is equivalent to the Monty Hall problem; the prisoner asking the question still has a  chance of being pardoned but his unnamed colleague has a  chance.

Steve Selvin posed the Monty Hall problem in a pair of letters to The American Statistician in 1975. The first letter presented the problem in a version close to its presentation in Parade 15 years later. The second appears to be the first use of the term "Monty Hall problem". The problem is actually an extrapolation from the game show. Monty Hall did open a wrong door to build excitement, but offered a known lesser prize – such as $100 cash – rather than a choice to switch doors. As Monty Hall wrote to Selvin:

A version of the problem very similar to the one that appeared three years later in Parade was published in 1987 in the Puzzles section of The Journal of Economic Perspectives. Nalebuff, as later writers in mathematical economics, sees the problem as a simple and amusing exercise in game theory.

"The Monty Hall Trap", Phillip Martin's 1989 article in Bridge Today, presented Selvin's problem as an example of what Martin calls the probability trap of treating non-random information as if it were random, and relates this to concepts in the game of bridge.

A restated version of Selvin's problem appeared in Marilyn vos Savant's Ask Marilyn question-and-answer column of Parade in September 1990. Though vos Savant gave the correct answer that switching would win two-thirds of the time, she estimates the magazine received 10,000 letters including close to 1,000 signed by PhDs, many on letterheads of mathematics and science departments, declaring that her solution was wrong. Due to the overwhelming response, Parade published an unprecedented four columns on the problem. As a result of the publicity the problem earned the alternative name "Marilyn and the Goats".

In November 1990, an equally contentious discussion of vos Savant's article took place in Cecil Adams's column "The Straight Dope". Adams initially answered, incorrectly, that the chances for the two remaining doors must each be one in two. After a reader wrote in to correct the mathematics of Adams's analysis, Adams agreed that mathematically he had been wrong. "You pick door #1. Now you're offered this choice: open door #1, or open door #2 and door #3. In the latter case you keep the prize if it's behind either door. You'd rather have a two-in-three shot at the prize than one-in-three, wouldn't you? If you think about it, the original problem offers you basically the same choice. Monty is saying in effect: you can keep your one door or you can have the other two doors, one of which (a non-prize door) I'll open for you." Adams did say the Parade version left critical constraints unstated, and without those constraints, the chances of winning by switching were not necessarily two out of three (e.g., it was not reasonable to assume the host always opens a door). Numerous readers, however, wrote in to claim that Adams had been "right the first time" and that the correct chances were one in two.

The Parade column and its response received considerable attention in the press, including a front-page story in The New York Times in which Monty Hall himself was interviewed. Hall understood the problem, giving the reporter a demonstration with car keys and explaining how actual game play on Let's Make a Deal differed from the rules of the puzzle. In the article, Hall pointed out that because he had control over the way the game progressed, playing on the psychology of the contestant, the theoretical solution did not apply to the show's actual gameplay. He said he was not surprised at the experts' insistence that the probability was 1 out of 2. "That's the same assumption contestants would make on the show after I showed them there was nothing behind one door," he said. "They'd think the odds on their door had now gone up to 1 in 2, so they hated to give up the door no matter how much money I offered. By opening that door we were applying pressure. We called it the Henry James treatment. It was 'The Turn of the Screw'." Hall clarified that as a game show host he did not have to follow the rules of the puzzle in the vos Savant column and did not always have to allow a person the opportunity to switch (e.g., he might open their door immediately if it was a losing door, might offer them money to not switch from a losing door to a winning door, or might allow them the opportunity to switch only if they had a winning door). "If the host is required to open a door all the time and offer you a switch, then you should take the switch," he said. "But if he has the choice whether to allow a switch or not, beware. Caveat emptor. It all depends on his mood."

See also

 MythBusters Episode 177 "Wheel of Mythfortune" – Pick a Door
 Principle of restricted choice – similar application of Bayesian updating in contract bridge
 Similar puzzles in probability and decision theory 
 Boy or Girl paradox
 Sleeping Beauty problem
 Two envelopes problem

References

Bibliography

 
 
 
 
 
 
 
 
 
 
 
 
 
 
 
 
 
 
 
 
 
 
 
 
 
 
 
 
 
 
 
 
 
 
 
 
 
 
 
 
 
 
 
 
 
 
 
 
 
 
 
 
 
 
 
 
 
 
 
 
 
 

Further reading
 
 
 

External links

 The Game Show Problem – the original question and responses on Marilyn vos Savant's web site
 University of California San Diego, Monty Knows Version and Monty Does Not Know Version, An Explanation of the Game
 
 "Stick or switch? Probability and the Monty Hall problem", BBC News Magazine'', 11 September 2013 (video). Mathematician Marcus du Sautoy explains the Monty Hall paradox.

1975 introductions
Decision-making paradoxes
Let's Make a Deal
Mathematical problems
Probability problems
Probability theory paradoxes